SV Viktoria 01 Aschaffenburg is a German football club based in Aschaffenburg, Bavaria.

Even though Aschaffenburg is located in Bavaria, Viktoria Aschaffenburg historically played its football in the Hessenliga (V) and the associated Hessian leagues, rather than the Bayernliga (V), against clubs from closer, neighbouring cities. This also reflects in part the history of the region, not traditionally part of Bavaria. The nearby Bavarian club FC Bayern Alzenau has also played in the Hessenliga for the same reasons. After 67 seasons in Hesse, from 1945 onwards, the members of the club voted with an 80% majority to return to Bavaria from the 2012–13 season onwards.

History
The club was formed on 24 June 1904 out of the merger of FC Aschaffenburg (6 August 1901) and FC Viktoria Aschaffenburg (12 April 1902). Renamed Sportverein Viktoria 01 Aschaffenburg on 3 June 1906 the united side played in the Kreisliga Odenwald, Kreisliga Nordmain, Kreisliga Südmain and Bezirksliga Main-Hessen (Gruppe Main) for a couple of seasons in the 1920s, changing leagues frequently.

In 1937 they briefly merged with Reichsbahn TuSpo Aschaffenburg to play as Reichsbahn-Viktoria Aschaffenburg, but were an independent side again by 1939. They made a late, short-lived appearance in top flight football in 1942, playing a single season in the Gauliga Bayern (Nord), one of sixteen premier divisions established in the 1933 re-organization of German football under the Third Reich.

Aschaffenburg returned to the top flight after World War II playing in the Oberliga Süd for two seasons in the late 40s and then through most of the 50s, competing against sides that would later go on to play in the Bundesliga, Germany's first top tier professional league, such as FC Bayern Munich, 1. FC Nürnberg, and VfB Stuttgart, in front of crowds of 16,000 to 19,000. Generally a lower table side whose best result was a fifth-place finish in 1956, a series of poor performances saw Aschaffenburg drop to tier III play in the Amateurliga Hessen/Amateur Oberliga-Hessen well before the formation of the Bundesliga in 1963.

The team's best performances came in the 1980s when they twice won the Oberliga Hessen title and promotion to 2. Bundesliga, where they played the 1985–86, 1986–87 and 1988–89 seasons. Through this period and into the early 90s Aschaffenburg made a half dozen appearances in the early rounds of DFB-Pokal (German Cup) play. The club's best cup performance came in 1988 when they eliminated then-Bundesliga side 1. FC Köln (1–0) in the second round before eventually going out in the quarterfinals against Werder Bremen (1–3).

A poor finish led to a move down to the fourth division play in the 1993–94 season. In 1995, the clubs under 19 side ended a remarkable series in German football. After 20 consecutive titles in the Under 19 Bayernliga (northern group) by the 1. FC Nürnberg, Viktoria finished this series, becoming only the second club to win this league. Viktoria's junior teams play in the Bavarian league system, unlike its senior team.

The side was relegated to Landesliga Hessen-Süd (V) for a single season in 2003–04 and have since returned to play in Oberliga-Hessen (IV).

A third-place finish in the Oberliga in 2007–08 meant the club became one of the four clubs from this league to gain entry in the Regionalliga Süd for the next season. After finishing 13th in the league in 2008–09, outside the relegation ranks, the club decided to return to the now-named Hessenliga due to financial reasons. Viktoria experienced a further drop at the end of the 2009–10 season when it was relegated to the tier-six Verbandsliga Hessen-Süd despite an eighth-place finish for financial reasons.

In this league, Viktoria came second in 2010–11 and qualified for the promotion round to the Hessenliga, where it succeeded. In November 2011, the members of the club voted for a return to the Bavarian league system after the club had played in Hesse since 1945. Alongside the senior team, the reserve side will also switch associations while the club's youth teams already play in Bavaria. The reasons for the switch were the easier qualification modus for the revamped Regionalligas for 2012, in Hesse the club needed to win the league while for Bavaria a ninth-place finish was adequate for promotion. Another reason was also the lesser requirements in regards to infrastructure for the new Regionalliga Bayern, an important factor for the recovering club who had just escaped insolvency in the previous year. A fourth-place finish in the Hessenliga in 2011–12 allowed the team to qualify for the new Regionalliga.

After a 15th place in the inaugural Regionalliga Bayern season Viktoria came second-last in the league in 2013–14 and was relegated from the league, now to the Bayernliga Nord, the northern division of the Bayernliga. The club won its division in 2014–15 and made an immediate return to the Regionalliga. It finished 15th in 2015–16 and had to enter the relegation play-off to defend its league place where it lost to SpVgg Bayern Hof and TSV 1860 Rosenheim and dropped back to the Bayernliga.

In 2018-19, the club enjoyed an excellent run in the Bavarian Cup, defeating 3. Liga club TSV 1860 Munich 3-2 at the semi-final stage,
before eventually losing 3-0 to local rivals Würzburger Kickers in the final before a packed crowd of 6,033 at the Stadion am Schönbusch.

Honours

League
 2. Oberliga Süd (II)
 Runners-up: (2) 1951, 1955
 Hessenliga (III-V)
 Champions: (4) 1974, 1985, 1988, 1992
 Runners-up: 2007
 Bayernliga Nord (V)
 Champions: (2) 2015, 2018
 Landesliga Hessen-Süd (V)
 Champions: 2004
 Verbandsliga Hessen-Süd (VI)
 Runners-up: 2011

Cup
 DFB-Pokal
 Quarter-finals: 1987–88
 Hessenpokal
 Winners: 1991
 Runners-up: 2008
 Bavarian Cup
 Runners-up: 2019

Youth
 Bavarian Under 19 championship
 Runners-up: (3) 1955, 1995, 2004
 Bavarian Under 17 championship
 Runners-up: 2002
 Bavarian Under 15 championship
 Winners: 1999

Recent seasons
The recent season-by-season performance of the club:

With the introduction of the Regionalligas in 1994 and the 3. Liga in 2008 as the new third tier, below the 2. Bundesliga, all leagues below dropped one tier. Also in 2008, the majority of football leagues in Hesse were renamed, with the Oberliga Hessen becoming the Hessenliga, the Landesliga becoming the Verbandsliga, the Bezirksoberliga becoming the Gruppenliga and the Bezirksliga becoming the Kreisoberliga.

Current squad

Recent managers
Recent managers of the club:

DFB Cup appearances
The club has qualified for the first round of the German Cup six times:

References

Sources
Grüne, Hardy (2001). Vereinslexikon. Kassel: AGON Sportverlag

External links

 Official team site  
 The Abseits Guide to German Soccer  
 Das deutsche Fußball-Archiv   historical German domestic league results
 Viktoria Aschaffenburg profile at worldfootball.net

 
Aschaffenburg
Football clubs in Germany
Football clubs in Bavaria
Association football clubs established in 1901
Football in Lower Franconia
1901 establishments in Germany
2. Bundesliga clubs